Messianic Judaism ( or) is a modernist and syncretic movement of Protestant Christianity that incorporates some elements of Judaism and other Jewish traditions into evangelicalism.

It emerged in the 1960s and 1970s from the earlier Hebrew Christian movement, and was most prominently propelled through the non-profit organization "Jews for Jesus" founded in 1973 by Martin "Moishe" Rosen, an American minister under the Conservative Baptist Association.

Evangelical Protestants who identify as Messianic Jews believe that Jesus (referred to by the Hebrew-language name  among adherents) is the Jewish Messiah prophesied in the Hebrew Bible, and that the Hebrew Bible (or Old Testament) and the New Testament are the authoritative scriptures of mankind. Salvation in Messianic Judaism is achieved only through the acceptance of Jesus as one's saviour, and not through adherence to Jewish rabbinical law. Belief in Jesus as a messianic figure and as divine (i.e. God the Son) is considered by Jews to be one of the most defining distinctions between Judaism and Christianity.

Among other evangelical groups, Messianic Judaism is usually accepted as a form of Christianity. However, adherents of Messianic Judaism claim that the movement is instead a form of Judaism. Jewish organizations inside and outside of Israel reject this framing; the Supreme Court of Israel has also rejected this claim in cases related to the Israeli Law of Return, and Messianic Judaism is recognized only as a Christian movement in the country. In this context, there is discourse among scholars as to whether Messianic Judaism should be labeled a Jewish or Christian religious sect.

From 2003 to 2007, the movement grew from 150 Messianic houses of worship in the United States to as many as 438, with over 100 in Israel and more worldwide; congregations are often affiliated with larger Messianic organizations or alliances. , Messianic population estimates were between 175,000 and 250,000 members in the United States, between 10,000 and 20,000 members in Israel, and an estimated total worldwide membership of 350,000.

History

Pre-19th century
Efforts by Jewish Christians to proselytize to Jews began in the 1st century, when Paul the Apostle preached at the synagogues in each city that he visited. However, by the 4th century CE, non-biblical accounts of missions to the Jews do not mention converted Jews playing any leading role in proselytization. Notable converts from Judaism who attempted to convert other Jews are more visible in historical sources beginning around the 13th century, when Jewish convert Pablo Christiani attempted to convert other Jews. This activity, however, typically lacked any independent Jewish-Christian congregations, and was often imposed through force by organized Christian churches.

19th and early 20th centuries

In the 19th century, some groups attempted to create congregations and societies of Jewish converts to Christianity, though most of these early organizations were short-lived. Early formal organizations run by converted Jews include: the Anglican London Society for promoting Christianity among the Jews of Joseph Frey (1809), which published the first Yiddish New Testament in 1821; the "Beni Abraham" association, established by Frey in 1813 with a group of 41 Jewish Christians who started meeting at Jews' Chapel, London for prayers Friday night and Sunday morning; and the London Hebrew Christian Alliance of Great Britain founded by Dr. Carl Schwartz in 1866.

The September 1813 meeting of Frey's "Beni Abraham" congregation at the rented "Jews' Chapel" in Spitalfields is sometimes pointed to as the birth of the semi-autonomous Hebrew Christian movement within Anglican and other established churches in Britain. However, the minister of the chapel at Spitalfields evicted Frey and his congregation three years later, and Frey severed his connections with the Society. A new location was found and the Episcopal Jew's Chapel Abrahamic Society registered in 1835.

In Eastern Europe, Joseph Rabinowitz established a Hebrew Christian mission and congregation called "Israelites of the New Covenant" in Kishinev, Bessarabia, in 1884. In 1865, Rabinowitz created a sample order of worship for Sabbath morning service based on a mixture of Jewish and Christian elements. Mark John Levy pressed the Church of England to allow members to embrace Jewish customs.

In the United States, a congregation of Jewish converts to Christianity was established in New York City in 1885. In the 1890s, immigrant Jewish converts to Christianity worshiped at the Methodist "Hope of Israel" mission on New York's Lower East Side while retaining some Jewish rites and customs. In 1895, the 9th edition of Hope of Israel's Our Hope magazine carried the subtitle "A Monthly Devoted to the Study of Prophecy and to Messianic Judaism", the first use of the term "Messianic Judaism". In 1894, Christian missionary Leopold Cohn, a convert from Judaism, founded the Brownsville Mission to the Jews in the Brownsville section of Brooklyn, New York as a Christian mission to Jews. After several changes in name, structure, and focus, the organization is now called Chosen People Ministries.

In the early 1900s there was a community of Messianic Jews in South Africa representing themselves as "Christian Jews" whose goal was to create a "true and genuine Christ-loving Jewish Christian Synogogue".

Missions to the Jews saw a period of growth between the 1920s and the 1960s. In the 1940s and 1950s, missionaries in Israel, including the Southern Baptists, adopted the term  ("messianics") to counter negative connotations of the word  ("Christians"). The term was used to designate all Jews who had converted to Protestant Evangelical Christianity.

Modern-day Messianic Judaism movement, 1960s onwards
The Messianic Jewish movement emerged in the United States in the 1960s. Prior to this time, Jewish converts assimilated into gentile Christianity, as the church required abandoning their Jewishness and assuming gentile ways to receive baptism. Peter Hocken postulates that the Jesus movement which swept the nation in the 1960s triggered a change from Hebrew Christians to Messianic Jews, and was a distinctly charismatic movement. These Jews wanted to "stay Jewish while believing in Jesus". This impulse was amplified by the results of the Six-Day War and the restoration of Jerusalem to Jewish control.

Foundational organizations
In 2004, there were 300 Messianic congregations in the United States, with roughly half of all attendants being gentiles, and roughly one third of all congregations consisting of 30 or fewer members. Many of these congregations belong to the International Association of Messianic Congregations and Synagogues (IAMCS), the Union of Messianic Congregations (UMJC), or Tikkun International.

The Messianic Jewish Alliance of America (MJAA) began in 1915 as the Hebrew Christian Alliance of America (HCAA). As the idea of maintaining Jewish identity spread in the late 1960s, the Hebrew Christian Alliance of America (HCAA) changed its name to the Messianic Jewish Alliance of America (MJAA). David Rausch writes that the change "signified far more than a semantical expression—it represented an evolution in the thought processes and religious and philosophical outlook toward a more fervent expression of Jewish identity." , the MJAA was an organization of Jewish members who welcome non-Jews as "honored associates". In 1986, the MJAA formed a congregational branch called the International Alliance of Messianic Congregations and Synagogues (IAMCS).

In June 1979, 19 congregations in North America met at Mechanicsburg, Pennsylvania and formed the Union of Messianic Jewish Congregations (UMJC). In 2022, it would have 75 congregations in 8 countries.
In 2016, Douglas Hamp founded The Way Congregation near Denver, CO. with the concept of recognizing fundamentalist Christian beliefs and yet embracing One Law Theology, Two House Theology (see sections below), and Commonwealth Theology.  Their website states the fellowship was founded "to serve as a bridge between the Jews and the gentile Church." Non-Jewish congregants are not encouraged to convert to Judaism and Jewish attendants are encouraged to celebrate their Jewish heritage. Hamp blames the heretic Marcion for mainstream Christianity's juxtaposition of Law and Grace. On the other hand, the Congregation meets on the Sabbath, celebrates the Feasts, and teaches conformance to the Dietary Laws given through Moses.

Messianic Seal of Jerusalem

The Messianic Seal of Jerusalem is a symbol used by Messianic Judaism. The symbol is a depiction of the Temple Menorah, an ancient Jewish symbol, together with the Ichthys, an ancient depictive representation of Christian faith and the community of Jesus followers, creating a Star of David at the intersection. The Messianic Seal is not the only symbol of Messianic Judaism, which has other symbols such the cross in the Star of David, and the dolphin.

There is an ongoing dispute as to whether or not the seal dates from the 1st century CE, or if it is a 20th-century invention.

Theology and core doctrines

As with many religious faiths, the exact tenets held vary from congregation to congregation. In general, essential doctrines of Messianic Judaism include views on:
 God is omnipotent, omnipresent, eternal, outside creation, infinitely significant and benevolent; viewpoints vary on the Trinity
 Jesus is the Messiah; views on his divinity vary
 Messianic Jews believe, with a few exceptions, that Jesus taught and reaffirmed the Torah and that it remains fully in force
 The Children of Israel are central to God's plan; replacement theology is opposed
 The Tanakh and the New Testament are usually considered the divinely inspired scripture, although Messianic Judaism is more open to criticism of the New Testament canon than is gentile Christianity. 
 Eschatology is similar to many Protestant views
 Observance of the Oral law varies, but most deem these traditions subservient to the written Torah

Certain additional doctrines are more open to differences in interpretation, including those on sin and atonement and on faith and works.

The Trinity
Many Messianic Jews affirm the doctrine of the Trinity: God the Father, God the Son, and God the Holy Spirit as three representations of the same divinity.

 God the Father: Messianic Jews believe in God, and that he is all-powerful, omnipresent, eternally existent outside of creation, and infinitely significant and benevolent.
 God the Son: Most Messianic Jews consider Jesus to be the Messiah and divine as God the Son, in line with mainstream Christianity, and will even pray directly to him. Many also consider Jesus to be their "chief teacher and rabbi" whose life should be copied.
 God the Holy Spirit: According to some Messianic Jews, the Spirit is introduced in the Old Testament, is the inspirer of prophets, and is the spirit of truth described in the New Testament.

God, Jesus, and the Holy Spirit
 God the Father: Some Messianic Jews profess only a strict view of monotheism, rejecting Trinitarian doctrine and Arian doctrine.
 Jesus the Son of God: Some Messianic Jews, who reject Trinitarian doctrine and Arian doctrine, believe that the Jewish Messiah is the son of God in the general sense (Jewish people are children of God) and that the Jewish Messiah is a mere human, the promised Prophet. Some Messianic Jews believe Jewish Messiah is the pre-existent Word of God, the mighty God, and the only begotten God. Some congregations do not directly ascribe divinity to Jesus, considering him a man, yet not just a man, fathered by the Holy Spirit, who became the Messiah. Even others consider him "Word made flesh" and the "human expression of Divinity".
 The Holy Spirit refers to the divine force, or to the word or spirit of God.

Scriptures and writings

The Bible
Both the Hebrew Bible and the New Testament are usually considered to be the established and divinely inspired biblical scriptures by Messianic Jews. With a few exceptions, Messianic believers generally consider the written Torah, the five books of Moses, to remain in force as a continuing covenant, revised by Jesus and the Apostles in the New Testament, that is to be observed both morally and ritually. Jesus did not annul the Torah, but its interpretation is revised through the Apostolic scriptures.

Jewish oral tradition
There is no unanimity among Messianic congregations on the issue of the Talmud and the Oral Torah. There are congregations which believe that adherence to the Oral Law, as encompassed by the Talmud, is against Messianic beliefs. Similarly, there are congregations which deny the authority of the Pharisees, believing that they were superseded, and their teachings contradicted, by Messianism. There are adherents which call rabbinic commentaries such as the Mishnah and the Talmud "dangerous", and state that followers of rabbinic and halakhic explanations and commentaries are not believers in Jesus as the Messiah. Other congregations are selective in their applications of Talmudic law, and may believe that the rabbinic commentaries such as the Mishnah and the Talmud, while historically informative and useful in understanding tradition, are not normative and may not be followed where they differ from the New Testament. Still others encourage a serious observance of Jewish halakha.

Messianic Bible translations

Messianic Jews generally consider the entire Christian Bible to be sacred scripture. Theologian David H. Stern in his "Jewish New Testament Commentary" argues that the writings and teachings of Paul the Apostle are fully congruent with Messianic Judaism, and that the New Testament is to be taken by Messianic Jews as the inspired Word of God.

Messianic publications
There are a number of Messianic commentaries on various books of the Bible, both Tanakh and New Testament texts, such as Matthew, Acts, Romans, Galatians, and Hebrews. David H. Stern has released a one-volume Jewish New Testament Commentary, providing explanatory notes from a Messianic Jewish point of view. Other New Testament commentary authors include Arnold Fruchtenbaum of Ariel Ministries, who has written commentaries on the Epistles, Judges and Ruth, Genesis, and 7 systematic doctrinal studies.

Sin and atonement
Some Messianic believers define sin as transgression of the Law of God and include the concept of original sin. Some adherents atone for their sins through prayer and repentance – the acknowledgment of the wrongdoing and seeking forgiveness for their sins (especially on Yom Kippur, the Day of Atonement). Disagreeing with these rites and practices, other Messianics hold to a belief that all sin (whether committed yet or not) is already atoned for because of Jesus's death and resurrection.

Evangelism and attitudes toward Jews and Israel
Messianic Jews believe God's people have a responsibility to spread his name and fame to all nations. It is believed that the Children of Israel were, remain, and will continue to be the chosen people of the God, and are central to his plans for existence. Most Messianic believers, whether Jewish or non-Jewish, can be said to oppose supersessionism (popularly referred to as replacement theology), the view that the Church has replaced Israel in the mind and plans of God.

There exist among Messianic believers a number of perspectives regarding who exactly makes up God's chosen people. Most commonly, Israel is seen as distinct from the church; Messianic Jews, being a part of both Israel and the church, are seen as the necessary link between the gentile people of God and the commonwealth of God's people of Israel. The two-house view, and the one law/grafted-in view are held by many identifying as Messianic, although some Messianic groups do not espouse these theologies. According to certain branches of Messianic Judaism, Jews are individuals who have one or more Jewish parents, or who have undergone halakhic conversion to Judaism. Others consider as Jewish any person who professes a belief in Jesus.

One Law theology
One Law theology (also known as "One Torah for All") teaches that anyone who is a part of Israel is obligated to observe the Covenant and its provisions as outlined in the Torah. Dan Juster of Tikkun, and Russ Resnik of the UMJC, have argued against the One Law movement's insistence on gentiles being required to observe the entirety of Torah in the same way as Jews. Tim Hegg responded to their article defending what he believes to be the biblical teaching of "One Law" theology and its implications concerning the obligations of Torah obedience by new Messianic believers from the nations. The Coalition of Torah Observant Messianic Congregations (CTOMC) likewise rejects bi-lateral Ecclesiology in favor of the One Torah for All (One Law) position.

Two House theology
Proponents of Two House theology espouse their belief that the phrase "House of Judah" in scripture refers to Jews, while "the House of Israel" refers to the Ten Lost Tribes of Israel, or Ephraim. Where scripture states the House of Israel and Judah will again be "one stick", it is believed to be referring to the End Times, immediately prior to the Second Coming, when many of those descended from Israel will come back to Israel. Advocates of this theology postulate that the reason so many gentiles convert to Messianic Judaism is that the vast majority of them are truly Israelites. Like One Law groups, the Two House movement has many superficial similarities to Messianic Judaism, such as their belief in the ongoing validity of the Mosaic Covenant. While much of the Two House teaching is based on interpretations of Biblical prophecy, the biggest disagreements are due to inability to identify the genealogy of the Lost Tribes. Organizations such as the Messianic Jewish Alliance of America and Union of Messianic Jewish Congregations have explicitly opposed the Two House teaching.

Supersessionism
Historically, Christianity has taught supersessionism (replacement theology), which implies or outright states that Christianity has superseded Judaism, and that the Mosaic Covenant of the Hebrew Bible has been superseded by the New Covenant of Jesus, wherein salvation is brought about by the grace of God, and not by obedience to the Torah. This is generally complemented with the concept of God having transferred the status of "God's people" from the Jews to the Christian Church. Messianic Jews, in varying degrees, challenge both thoughts, and instead believing that although Israel has rejected Jesus, it has not forfeited its status as God's chosen people. Often cited is : "for God's gifts and his call are irrevocable". The core of supersessionism, in which the Mosaic Covenant is canceled, is less agreed upon. Though the mitzvot may or may not be seen as necessary, most are still followed, especially the keeping of Shabbat and other holy days.

Eschatology
All Messianic Jews hold to certain eschatological beliefs such as the End of Days, the Second Coming of Jesus as the conquering Messiah, the re-gathering of Israel, a rebuilt Third Temple, a resurrection of the dead, and many believe in the Millennial Sabbath, although some are Amillenialist. Some Messianic Jews believe that all of the Jewish holidays, and indeed the entire Torah, intrinsically hint at the Messiah, and thus no study of the End Times is complete without understanding the major Jewish Festivals in their larger prophetic context. To certain believers, the feasts of Pesach and Shavuot were fulfilled in Jesus's first coming, and Rosh Hashanah, Yom Kippur, and Sukkot will be at his second. Some also believe in a literal 7000-year period for the human history of the world, with a Millennial Messianic kingdom prior to a final judgment.

Religious practices

Torah observance

There is a variety of practice within Messianic Judaism regarding the strictness of Torah observance. Generally, Torah observant congregations observe Jewish prayers, biblical feasts, and the Sabbath. While most traditional Christians deny that the ritual laws and specific civil laws of the Torah apply to gentiles, certain passages regarding Torah observance in the New Testament are cited by some Messianic believers as proof that the Torah was not abolished for Jews.

Sabbath and holiday observances
Some Messianic Jews observe Shabbat on Saturdays. Worship services are generally held on Friday evenings or Saturday mornings. According to the Southern Baptist Messianic Fellowship (SBMF), services are held on Saturday to "open the doors to Jewish people who also wish to keep the Sabbath". The liturgy used is similar to that of a Jewish  with some important differences including the omission of "salvation by works" as the Messianic belief is salvation through Jesus. Other branches of the movement have attempted to "eliminate the elements of Christian worship [such as frequent communion] that cannot be directly linked to their Jewish roots". Almost all such congregations in Israel observe Jewish holidays, which they understand to have their fulfillment in Jesus."

The Messianic Jewish Rabbinical Council recommends the observance of Jewish holidays. Most larger Messianic Jewish congregations follow Jewish custom in celebrating the three biblical feasts (Pesach, Shavuot, and Sukkot), as well as Yom Kippur and Rosh Hashanah.

Dietary laws
The observance of the  dietary laws is a subject of continued debate among Messianic Jews. Some Messianic believers keep kosher purely for the purposes of evangelism to Jewish people. Most avoid pork and shellfish, but there is disagreement on more strict adherence to kosher dietary laws.

Conversion to Messianic Judaism
Large numbers of those calling themselves Messianic Jews are not of Jewish descent, but join the movement as they "enjoy the Messianic Jewish style of worship". Messianic perspectives on "Who is a Jew?" vary. The Messianic Jewish Rabbinical Council, acknowledges a Jew as one born to a Jewish mother, or who has converted to Judaism. Copying from the Reform stream of Judaism, the Council also recognizes as a Jew one who was born to a Jewish father but not a Jewish mother on the condition that the family of the child, or the individual as an adult, has undertaken public and formal acts of identification of the individual with the Jewish faith and people. The MJAA accepts gentiles into their congregations, but views gentiles and Jews as spiritually distinct and conversion as an "unbiblical practice".

Baptism

Circumcision

Some within the Ephraimite movement seek to convert themselves for identification with Israel, but most Messianic governing bodies acknowledge the presence of gentiles in the congregations, and do not see a need for them to convert to worship in the Messianic style and understanding. When conversion is sincerely desired by a gentile Messianic believer, Messianic Jewish halachic standards (including circumcision) are imposed to maintain integrity among the world Messianic Jewish community.

Use of Hebrew names and vocabulary in English
The movement generally avoids common Christian terms, such as Jesus, Christ, or cross and prefers to use Hebrew or Aramaic terms.

Culture

Music
Messianic Jewish hymns differ from evangelical Christian ones in their focus on Israel's role in history and messianic hope. Other differences include reference to Jesus—usually using the name —as the "Savior of Israel". Messianic hymnals often incorporate Israeli songs. The movement has several recording artists who consider their music to be Messianic in message, such as Joel Chernoff of the duo Lamb, Ted Pearce, and Chuck King.

Reception

Among mainstream Christianity
In the United States, the emergence of the Messianic Jewish movement created some stresses with other Jewish-Christian and missionary organization. In 1975, the Fellowship of Christian Testimonies to the Jews condemned several aspects of the Messianic Jewish movement.

The Israel Trust of the Anglican Church, based at Christ Church, Jerusalem, an organization that is ecumenical in outlook and operates an interfaith school in Jerusalem, gives some social support to Messianic Jews in Israel.

Among Jews

As in traditional Jewish objections to Christian theology, opponents of Messianic Judaism hold that Christian proof texts, such as prophecies in the Hebrew Bible purported to refer the Messiah's suffering and death, have been taken out of context and misinterpreted. Jewish theology rejects the idea that the Messiah, or any human being, is a divinity. Belief in the Trinity is considered idolatrous by most rabbinic authorities. Even if considered  (literally, "partnership")—an association of other individuals with the God of Israel—this is only permitted for gentiles, and that only according to some rabbinic opinions. It is universally considered idolatrous for Jews. Further, Judaism does not view the role of the Messiah to be the salvation of the world from its sins, an integral teaching of Christianity and Messianic Judaism.

Jewish opponents of Messianic Judaism often focus their criticism on the movement's radical ideological separation from traditional Jewish beliefs, stating that the acceptance of Jesus as Messiah creates an insuperable divide between the traditional messianic expectations of Judaism, and Christianity's theological claims. They state that while Judaism is a messianic religion, its messiah is not Jesus, and thus the term is misleading. All denominations of Judaism, as well as national Jewish organizations, reject Messianic Judaism as a form of Judaism. Regarding this divide, Reconstructionist Rabbi Carol Harris-Shapiro observed: "To embrace the radioactive core of goyishness—Jesus—violates the final taboo of Jewishness.[...] Belief in Jesus as Messiah is not simply a heretical belief, as it may have been in the first century; it has become the equivalent to an act of ethno-cultural suicide."

B'nai Brith Canada considers Messianic activities as antisemitic incidents. Rabbi Tovia Singer, founder of the anti-missionary organization Outreach Judaism, noted of a Messianic rabbi in Toledo: "He's not running a Jewish synagogue.[...] It's a church designed to appear as if it were a synagogue and I'm there to expose him. What these irresponsible extremist Christians do is a form of consumer fraud. They blur the distinctions between Judaism and Christianity in order to lure Jewish people who would otherwise resist a straightforward message."

Association by a Jewish politician with a Messianic rabbi, inviting him to pray at a public meeting, even though made in error, resulted in nearly universal condemnation by Jewish congregations in Detroit in 2018, as the majority opinion in both Israeli and American Jewish circles is to consider Messianic Judaism as Christianity and its followers as Christians.

Response of Israeli government

Messianic Jews are considered eligible for the State of Israel's Law of Return only if they can also claim Jewish descent. An assistant to one of the two lawyers involved with an April 2008 Supreme Court of Israel case explained to the Jerusalem Post that Messianic Jews who are not Jewish according to Jewish rabbinic law, but who had sufficient Jewish descent to qualify under the Law of Return, could claim automatic new immigrant status and citizenship despite being Messianic. The state of Israel grants  (right of return) and citizenship to Jews, and to those with Jewish parents or grandparents who are not considered Jews according to halakha, such as people who have a Jewish father but a non-Jewish mother. The old law had excluded any "person who has been a Jew and has voluntarily changed his religion", and an Israeli Supreme Court decision in 1989 had ruled that Messianic Judaism constituted another religion. However, on April 16, 2008, the Supreme Court of Israel ruled in a case brought by a number of Messianic Jews with Jewish fathers and grandfathers. Their applications for  had been rejected on the grounds that they were Messianic Jews. This argument was upheld in the ruling.

The International Religious Freedom Report 2008, released by the Bureau of Democracy, Human Rights, and Labor in the US, stated that discrimination against Messianic Jews in Israel was increasing. Some acts of violence have also occurred; in one incident on March 20, 2008, a bomb concealed as a Purim gift basket was delivered to the house of a prominent Messianic Jewish family in Ariel, in the West Bank, which severely wounded the son. Eventually, Yaakov Teitel was arrested for the attempted murder.

This antagonism has led to harassment and some violence, especially in Israel, where there is a large and militant Orthodox community. Several Orthodox organizations, including Yad L'Achim, are dedicated to rooting out missionary activity in Israel, including the Messianic Jewish congregations. One tactic is to plaster posters asking Israelis to boycott shops where Messianic Jews are owners or employees; another is to report Messianic Jews to the Interior ministry, which is charged with enforcing an Israeli law forbidding proselytizing. In another incident, the mayor of Or Yehuda, a suburb of Tel Aviv, held a public book-burning of literature passed out to Ethiopian immigrants. He later apologized for the action.

Response of US governments
The US Navy made a decision that Messianic Jewish chaplains must wear as their insignia the Christian cross, and not the tablets of the law, the insignia of Jewish chaplains. According to Yeshiva World News, the Navy Uniform Board commanded that Michael Hiles, a candidate for chaplaincy, wear the Christian insignia. Hiles resigned from the program, rather than wear the cross. Rabbi Eric Tokajer, a spokesman for the Messianic Jewish movement, responded that "This decision essentially bars Messianic Jews from serving as chaplains within the U.S. Navy because it would require them to wear an insignia inconsistent with their faith and belief system."

A Birmingham, Alabama police employee's religious discrimination case was settled in her favor after she filed suit over having to work on the Jewish Sabbath.

Messianic organizations

 Chosen People Ministries (CPM).
 HaYesod ("the foundation") is a discipleship course that respectfully explores the Jewish foundation of Christianity. There are currently 259 HaYesod study groups of five or more members.
 International Alliance of Messianic Congregations and Synagogues (IAMCS).
 Jewish University of Colorado
 Jews for Jesus (contested).
 Messianic Jewish Alliance of America (MJAA).
 Messianic Jewish Rabbinical Council
 Union of Messianic Jewish Congregations (UMJC).

See also

 Black Hebrew Israelites
 Ebionites
 Hebrew Catholics
 Hebrew Roots
 Jews for Jesus
 Judeo-Christian
 Makuya
 Twelve Tribes of Israel (Rastafari)
 Xueta Christianity

Notes

References

Works Cited

Further reading
 

 

 

 
Christian new religious movements
Jewish Christianity
Religious syncretism
Subcultures of religious movements